Antonio Jesús Caballero Ramírez (born 6 January 1994) is a Spanish footballer who plays for San Fernando CD as a midfielder.

Club career
Born in Martos, Jaén, Andalusia, Caballero made his senior debut with Martos CD in the 2013–14 season, in Tercera División. On 3 July 2014 he moved to Segunda División B side Real Balompédica Linense, but on 28 August he joined fellow league team Lucena CF after cutting ties with the former.

After being rarely used, Caballero left Lucena and returned to Martos on 28 December 2014. The following 7 February, however, he signed for UD Ciudad de Torredonjimeno, both in the fourth division. On 25 June 2015, he agreed to a contract with Atlético Mancha Real.

On 20 January 2016 Caballero joined Elche CF, being assigned to the reserves still in the fourth tier. On 15 April of the following year he made his first team debut, coming on as a second-half substitute for Armando in a 1–3 Segunda División home loss against CD Numancia.

Caballero left the Franjiverdes in July 2017, and subsequently represented third division sides Rápido de Bouzas, CD Castellón and CD Badajoz, reaching the play-offs with the latter. On 21 August 2020, he agreed to a deal with CD Mirandés in the second tier.

On 26 July 2021, free agent Caballero agreed to a contract with Primera División RFEF side UCAM Murcia CF.

Personal life
Caballero's younger brother Raúl is also a footballer. A forward, he played for Córdoba CF and UD Almería as a youth.

References

External links

1994 births
Living people
Sportspeople from the Province of Jaén (Spain)
Spanish footballers
Footballers from Andalusia
Association football midfielders
Segunda División players
Primera Federación players
Segunda División B players
Tercera División players
Martos CD footballers
Lucena CF players
Elche CF Ilicitano footballers
Elche CF players
CD Castellón footballers
CD Badajoz players
CD Mirandés footballers
UCAM Murcia CF players
San Fernando CD players